Apnenik is a settlement in the foothills of the Gorjanci range in the Municipality of Šentjernej in southeastern Slovenia. The area is part of the traditional region of Lower Carniola. It is now included in the Southeast Slovenia Statistical Region.

References

External links
Apnenik on Geopedia

Populated places in the Municipality of Šentjernej